Promise Mkwananzi is a politician from Zimbabwe. He is a former President of the Zimbabwe National Student Union (ZINASU), serving from 2006 to 2007. During his career as a student leader, Mkwananzi was expelled from the University of Zimbabwe. He was also arrested numerous times for leading students protests against the government's unjust education policies. He was elected into the MDC youth assembly as secretary general and appointed a member of the national executive committee as secretary for youth affairs, making him the youngest national executive member in the party's history at 28. A once close ally of Morgan Tsvangirai, Mkwananzi split with Tsvangirai in 2014 and went with former Finance Minister Tendai Biti's renewal group. He split further with Biti and went with Elton Mangoma to form the Renewal Democrats of Zimbabwe where he was briefly Secretary General before he left the party to joining the social movement Tajamuka in 2016. with the then party  did his education at the Utrecht University in Netherlands where he attained a bachelor's degree in political science and international relations. He also attained a masters in international development studies. Mkwananzi is also a fierce advocate of youth autonomy, arguing that the youth should be at the forefront of both the revolution and decision making though financial scandals below seat his image a heavy blow. He is widely known for his eye for an eye call in which he called upon the youth to retaliate against violence from ZANU PF youths. Mkwananzi lives in Harare, Zimbabwe.

Attempted arrest
Police tried unsuccessfully to arrest Mkwananzi on June 20, 2007, in an incident where "his relatives in Waterfalls and Glen Norah were beaten up with clenched fists and baton sticks after they told police Mkwananzi did not live with them anymore". Mkwananzi said he believed that they were trying to prevent him from travelling to Europe for the Save Zimbabwe Campaign. A few days earlier police confiscated the passport of the President of the Movement for Democratic Change, Arthur Mutambaraan, raided the house of the vice-chairperson the Students Christian Movement of Zimbabwe, Lawrence Mashungu, and beat the Student Representative Council President of Great Zimbabwe University, Whitlaw Tanyanyiwa Mugwiji, so badly that he had to be hospitalised.
Prior to the 2013 elections Mkwananzi was cautioned by Morgan Tsvangirai along with Solomon Madzore to desist from hate speech.

Tajamuka and Looting Scandals

On 16 June 2016, the #Tajamuka protest movement was launched in Zimbabwe and Promise Mkwananzi came out as its spokesperson. On 2 October 2017, he was accused by multiple anonymous donors of "abusing thousands of dollars mobilized to bankroll the social movement’s activities". On 3 October 2017, Mkwananzi resigned amid pressure from fellow activists. Allegations of corruption during his days as MDCT Youth Secretary also emerged, as he was accused of having looted US$75,000 of funds meant for youth programs. He has also been accused of working with the Vice President Emmerson Mnangagwa's (ZANU PF) Lacoste faction.

References

Year of birth missing (living people)
Living people
Zimbabwean politicians